A list of notable Argentine philosophers:

A
 Tomás Abraham
 Coriolano Alberini
 Alberto Buela
 Agustín Álvarez

B
 Alberto Baldrich
 Jaime Barylko
 Mario Bunge

C
 Samuel Cabanchik
 Ángel Cappelletti
 Adolfo Carpio
 Manuel Casas
 Nicolás Casullo
 Alberto Caturelli
 Buenaventura Chumillas Laguía
 Conrado Eggers Lan
 Carlos Cossio

D
 Fernando Demaría
 Jorge Dorio
 Enrique Dussel

E 
 Ernesto Garzón Valdés

F
 Ángel Faretta
 José Pablo Feinmann
 Eduardo H. Flichman
 Ricardo Forster
 Risieri Frondizi

G
 Werner Goldschmidt

H
Daniel Herrendorf

I
 José Ingenieros

J
 Amadeo Jacques
 Christofredo Jakob

K
 Gregorio Klimovsky
 Alejandro Korn
 Santiago Kovadloff

L
 Ernesto Laclau
 Juan Crisóstomo Lafinur
 Jorge Ángel Livraga Rizzi

M
 Tomás Maldonado
 Ricardo Maliandi
 Hugo Celso Felipe Mansilla
 Víctor Massuh
 Julio Meinvielle
 Rodolfo Mondolfo

N
 Carlos Santiago Nino

O
 José Oliva Nogueira
 Oscar Terán

P
 Gustavo Daniel Perednik
 Alejandro Piscitelli

R
Eduardo Rabossi
 Rodolfo Kusch
 Arturo Andrés Roig
 Francisco Romero
 Alberto Rougès
 León Rozitchner

S
 Carlos Alberto Sacheri
 Beatriz Sarlo
 Raúl Scalabrini Ortiz
 Friedrich Schickendantz
 Federico Schuster
 Fernando Schwarz
 Juan José Sebreli

V
 Ángel Vasallo
 Gustavo Varela
 Debret Viana
 Vicente Fatone